The Kennel Club (KC) is the official kennel club of the United Kingdom. It is the oldest recognised kennel club in the world. Its role is to oversee various canine activities including dog shows, dog agility and working trials. It also operates the national register of pedigree dogs in the United Kingdom and acts as a lobby group on issues involving dogs in the UK. Its headquarters are on Clarges Street in Mayfair, London, with business offices in Aylesbury.

The Kennel Club registration system divides dogs into seven breed groups. The Kennel Club Groups are: Hound group, Working group, Terrier group, Gundog group, Pastoral group, Utility group and Toy group. As of 2021, The Kennel Club recognised 222 breeds of dog.

The Kennel Club licenses dog shows throughout the UK, but the only dog show it actually runs is Crufts. The show has been held since 1928 and attracts competitors from all over the world. It is held every March at the NEC, Birmingham, and includes the less formal Scruffts show for crossbreed and mixed-breed dogs. The Kennel Club also holds the Discover Dogs event in London every autumn.

The Kennel Club is a non-member partner with the Fédération Cynologique Internationale.

History

The Kennel Club was founded on 4 April 1873 after Sewallis E. Shirley became frustrated by trying to organise dog shows without a consistent set of rules. Since the first dog show in 1859, shows had become increasingly popular. Shirley is listed as an exhibitor of Fox Terriers at the Birmingham Dog Show Society show in 1865. Together with a group of other gentlemen, he organised the First Grand Exhibition of Sporting and Other Dogs held at Crystal Palace in June 1870. The show was not a financial success and the organisers had to make up the loss.

This seems to have been the trigger for Shirley to call a meeting with 12 others who had an interest in judging and exhibiting pedigree dogs. The meeting, in 1873, agreed to set up the Kennel Club. It was held at 2 Albert Mansions, Victoria Street, London, a small flat with only three rooms. All business was conducted from there until a move to Pall Mall in May 1877.

It was decided they would be responsible for publishing a Stud Book and the first volume was published and ready to be distributed in December 1874. It listed pedigrees of dogs competing at shows from 1859 and also included a "Code of Rules for the guidance of Dog Shows and Field trials"

Shirley was appointed as chairman at the first annual general meeting of the Kennel Club on 1 December 1874.

The Kennel Club saw particular change under the chairmanship of John MacDougall during the period 1981 to 1996. Among the changes he helped introduce were the revamping of the Club's constitution, the development of the Junior Organisation to encourage youth participation in the sport of dog showing, and the creation of the library and the charitable trust. It was also under his stewardship that the registration system became computerised.

Crufts

The first successful annual all-breed dog show was produced by Charles Cruft in 1891. He produced the Crufts dog show for 45 years until his death in 1938. His widow, Emma, continued for four shows. She then sold it to the Kennel Club, as she felt unable to devote the time to running such a large undertaking and she wanted to perpetuate her husband's legacy. No shows were held during the Second World War. The first Crufts show held by the Kennel Club was in 1948 at Olympia, London. The show was first televised by the BBC in 1950. The 1954 edition was cancelled due to the strike of electricians.

The show moved to Earls Court in 1979, where it remained until staging its centenary show in 1991 at the National Exhibition Centre in Birmingham, where it still takes place. From originally being a show for the exhibition of purebred dogs, it has expanded over the years and now incorporates most other canine disciplines such as Obedience, Agility, and Flyball.

Discover Dogs

Initially the Discover Dogs event was staged as a part of Crufts dog show, but as its popularity increased it became a stand-alone event. Established in 1996, it gives the public an opportunity to meet representatives of all pedigree dog breeds and talk with breed experts about the suitability of the breed as a pet.

Until 2014, this two-day annual event was held at Earls Court Exhibition Centre in London in November. Since 2015, it has been held in October at the ExCeL Centre in East London.

The event includes the semi-finals for the Kennel Gazette Junior Warrant competition, a competition for pedigree dogs aged between six and 18 months, and the National Junior Handling UK final, as well as agility competitions and displays by police and other dog teams. There are also a large number of trade stalls. It is popular, with the 2012 event drawing a crowd of over 30,000.

From 2000 to 2012, Discover Dogs also hosted the finals of the Scruffts Family Crossbreed of the Year competition for mixed-breed dogs. Since 2013, this has been held in conjunction with the main Crufts show.

Kennel Club Charitable Trust
The Kennel Club Charitable Trust is a dog charity that looks after the welfare and health of dogs. They fund a wide variety of work, including supporting research into canine diseases, dog welfare organisations and the promotion of service dogs. Set up in 1987, it was first registered with the Charity Commission in May 1988. The Duchess of Cornwall became the first patron of the Trust in October 2007 when it celebrated its twentieth anniversary.

The Kennel Club makes many donations to charitable causes, with grants totalling over £10 million between the club's foundation and 2020. The Animal Health Trust (AHT) has frequently received donations from the Kennel Club and, in 2012, a £1.5 million interest free loan was granted to the AHT to enable it to complete the building and equipping of a new animal cancer treatment and research centre at its base in Suffolk. The AHT also regularly receives funding to enable work to continue at the Genetics Centre run in conjunction with the Kennel Club. The sum of £250,000 was donated to the Genetics Centre in 2010. During 2010, the Kennel Club Charitable Trust had provided almost £800,000 to help non-pedigree as well as pedigree organisations.

The Kennel Club Charitable Trust also funded a new building at the National Agricultural Centre, Stoneleigh Park, Kenilworth, which was opened by Prince Michael of Kent in February 2009. The facilities are used for various canine related competitions, training, seminars and charity events.

Kennel Club Dog Art Gallery

The Kennel Club Dog Art Gallery is located at the club's headquarters in Mayfair, London. The gallery is devoted to fine art about dogs and features themed exhibitions, as well as a permanent collection.  Artists in the collection include Maud Earl, George Earl, Richard Ansdell, Arthur Wardle and Cecil Aldin. The gallery is open only by appointment.

The art gallery opened in 2003 and was the idea of former Kennel Club Chairman John McDougall. The Kennel Club had accumulated quite a large collection of canine artwork, including 130 oil paintings,100 works on paper, nearly 100 engravings and prints, and the same number of sculptures and trophies. The collection is still being added to. Various exhibitions are held covering a variety of breeds, such as English Setters, Gordon Setters, and Irish Setters. To gain more awareness of the collection available at the art gallery, it sometimes stages exhibitions at art and design fairs. Former Kennel Club chairman Ronnie Irving is quoted as saying "The great thing about the Kennel Club Art Gallery is that it's a way of encouraging those people interested in dogs to learn a bit more about art and those people interested in art to do likewise about dogs."

Assured Breeder scheme
The Accredited Breeder Scheme was launched in 2004 but was later renamed as the Assured Breeder scheme (ABS). As the ABS membership grew, a number of regional advisors were recruited to inspect breeders' premises and paperwork to ensure adequate standards were being met. Breed specific recommendations were added to some breeds for the first time in January 2010 after consultations with breed clubs.

The scheme was meant to help potential dog owners identify responsible breeders, but has been described by the Dogs Trust as "full of pitfalls, the main one being that it's self-certificating". The Associate Parliamentary Group for Animal Welfare report indicated that the low breeding standards practiced by some in the ABS may allow the public to be "falsely led into thinking a puppy they buy from an accredited breeder registered with the KC will have no health or welfare problems associated with its breeding history." It called for more random checks and robust enforcement of the scheme and states that "the use of the word ‘pedigree’ should be tied to a high standard of breeding (for health and welfare) across the board with the KC not just with the few that decide to join the Accredited Breeder Scheme (ABS)."

The report warned that if the health measures implemented by the Kennel Club fails, government regulations might be necessary. The Kennel Club issued a response to the report. Pedigree Dogs Exposed producer Jemima Harrison condemned the Kennel Club's response, stating that they are downplaying the criticism of the Kennel Club in the report and misrepresenting the findings.

In April 2013, it was announced that the ABS scheme had secured recognition by the United Kingdom Accreditation Service (UKAS). Various changes were made to the scheme to gain accreditation, which included ensuring inspections were made of all new members' premises and that those who were already members would be checked within a three-year time period. In January 2010, Prof. Sir Patrick Bateson had advocated seeking UKAS accreditation in his Independent Inquiry into Dog Breeding.

Other programmes
In February 2013, the Kennel Club launched a programme called "Get Fit With Fido", which encouraged dog owners to lose weight by exercising with their dogs.

Pedigree Dogs Exposed 

The organisation was criticised in an August 2008 BBC programme Pedigree Dogs Exposed for allowing breed standards, judging standards and breeding practices which are said to compromise the health of purebred dogs. The programme led various sponsors to withdraw their participation in Crufts and the BBC eventually dropped Crufts 2009 from its coverage. The Kennel Club initially defended their practices, and criticised the programme as "highly biased". It also lodged a complaint to regulatory authority Ofcom. Ofcom rejected the Kennel Club's claim of unfair editing and deceit, but found that the BBC did not give the Kennel Club "a proper opportunity to respond" to four specific allegations, including "an allegation about eugenics and a comparison with Hitler and the Nazi Party, or an allegation that it covered up the nature of an operation carried out on a Crufts Best in Show winner."

Due to the strong public response, the Kennel Club started rolling out new health plans. Breed standards for every breed went under review and show judges would be required to choose only healthy dogs. New breed standards were announced in January 2009 and close inbreeding was banned.

References

Citations

General bibliography

External links
 The Kennel Club
 
 Discover Dogs

Organizations established in 1873
Clubs and societies in London
1873 establishments in the United Kingdom
Dogs in the United Kingdom